Oreosaurus mcdiarmidi is a species of lizard in the family Gymnophthalmidae. It is endemic to Chimantá Massif in Venezuela.

References

Oreosaurus
Reptiles of Venezuela
Endemic fauna of Venezuela
Reptiles described in 2011
Taxa named by Philippe J.R. Kok
Taxa named by Gilson Rivas
Taxobox binomials not recognized by IUCN